Quake is a series of first-person shooter video games, developed by id Software and, as of 2010, published by Bethesda Softworks. The series is composed of the eponymous game from 1996 and its nonlinear, standalone sequels which vary in setting and plot.

Quake was created as a successor franchise to id's highly successful Doom series, which had begun in 1993. As a new series, it built upon the fast-paced gameplay, game engine, and 3D graphics capabilities of Doom. It also expanded upon the multiplayer capabilities of Doom by introducing online multiplayer over the internet. This contributed to the popularity of the Quake series and characterized it as a figurehead in online gaming.

Games

Every game in the Quake franchise shares a basis in first-person shooter gameplay. However, the series lacks a singular narrative across all of its entries. Two major storylines exist within the franchise, as well as the Arena series, which focuses primarily on multiplayer gameplay.

Original storyline 
The game's original plot focused on the player character, later known as "Ranger" in Quake III Arena, who travels across alternate dimensions to stop an enemy code-named "Quake". The game takes place in a Lovecraftian setting with a mixture of dark fantasy, pseudo-medieval, and science fiction.

Quake (1996)
Quake Mission Pack No. 1: Scourge of Armagon (1997)
Quake Mission Pack No. 2: Dissolution of Eternity (1997)
Quake: Dimension of the Past (2016; chronologically set between Quake and its two expansions)
Quake: Dimension of the Machine (2021)

Quake II storyline 
Shifting the series to the science fiction genre, Quake II and its sequels chronicle the war between humanity and the cybernetic alien race known as the Strogg.

Quake II (1997)
Quake II Mission Pack: The Reckoning (1998)
Quake II Mission Pack: Ground Zero (1998)
Quake 4 (2005)
Enemy Territory: Quake Wars (2007; a spin-off of the series and a successor to Wolfenstein: Enemy Territory, with a storyline set before the events of Quake II)

Arena series 
Quake III Arena and its successors focus on competitive multiplayer rather than a single-player experience. These games de-emphasized the setting of the first two installments while still retaining continuity with them and crossing over with id's Doom franchise. Quake Champions, in particular, is heavily influenced by the mythology of the original game.
 
Quake III Arena (1999)
Quake III: Team Arena (2000)
Quake Live (2010; an updated version of Quake III Arena originally designed as a free-to-play game launched via a web plug-in)
Quake Champions (2017)

Reception

Since its first release, the series has received mostly positive reviews.

Quake, Quake II, and Quake III Arena have all been considered by various video game journalists and magazines to be among the greatest video games of all time.

Controversy 
Like Doom, the Quake series initially received controversy due to containing high amounts of graphic violence. Public and media outcry over Quake and other violent video games peaked after the Columbine High School massacre occurred on April 20, 1999, and it became known that perpetrators Eric Harris and Dylan Klebold were avid players of both Doom and Quake. This finding prompted claims from media outlets that violent video games caused negative psychological effects on children that made them more aggressive and accepting of violence.

id Software co-founder John Romero later stated in a 2013 interview that the company and its developers had never intended to "offend people or shock people" with their games.

See also
Quake engine - the game engine developed for the original Quake that would become the basis for engines in later entries in the series
QuakeWorld - an update to id Software's seminal multiplayer deathmatch game, Quake, that enhances the game's multiplayer features
Doom - id's predecessor franchise to Quake, which began in 1993
Unreal - a rival franchise developed by Epic Games that began in 1998

References

 
Microsoft franchises
Video game franchises introduced in 1996